Daytona Stadium, is a 9,601-seat multi-purpose stadium in Daytona Beach, Florida, built in 1988 and home to the Bethune–Cookman University Wildcats football team. It is also used to host home games for the Mainland High School and Seabreeze High School football teams.  The stadium is also known as Larry Kelly Field, a name honoring former Daytona Beach Mayor Lawrence J. Kelly.

History
Until the end of the 2009 Bike Week season, the stadium hosted the AMA Flat Track motorcycle championships during Daytona Beach Bike Week. When the city took the track down as part of changes to the stadium, those races moved to a new dirt track at Daytona International Speedway.

In 2008 and 2009 the stadium was the location of the Florida Football Alliance annual "Alliance Bowl" season-championship game. It was held in Jacksonville for the 2010 season while Municipal Stadium underwent surface replacement. The Alliance Bowl returned in 2011.

Since 2014, the stadium has hosted the NAIA National Championship football game.

In January of 2017, 2018, and 2019, the stadium hosted the Tropical Bowl, a postseason college football all-star game.

See also
 List of NCAA Division I FCS football stadiums

References

External links
Bethune-Cookman Athletic Facilities

Bethune–Cookman Wildcats football
College football venues
Sports venues in Florida
Multi-purpose stadiums in the United States
1988 establishments in Florida
Sports venues completed in 1988
High school football venues in the United States
American football venues in Florida
Soccer venues in Florida